Prey Invasion is a first-person shooter video game developed by American studio MachineWorks, and published by Hands-On Mobile in cooperation with 3D Realms for the iOS. It is based on Prey for Microsoft Windows and Xbox 360.

Development
Prey Invasion was first announced February 9, 2009 by IGN, the game was released on June 8, 2009.

Reception

Prey Invasion was well received by critics with many applauding the control scheme, graphics, and pricepoint.

References

External links
Machine Works

2009 video games
3D Realms games
Alien abduction in video games
First-person shooters
IOS-only games
IOS games
Science fiction video games
Video games about extraterrestrial life
Video games developed in the United States